Guarea jamaicensis is a species of plant in the family Meliaceae. It is endemic to Jamaica. It is threatened by habitat loss.

References

jamaicensis
Vulnerable plants
Endemic flora of Jamaica
Taxonomy articles created by Polbot